Rubén Darío Lizarralde Montoya is the 12th Minister of Agriculture and Rural Development of Colombia, serving in the administration of President Juan Manuel Santos Calderón. Prior to his appointment, Lizarralde, a lawyer from the Pontifical Xavierian University with a Master of Science in Project Management from the University of Miami Business School, was General Manager of Indupalma, a Colombian palm oil-producing company, and member of the Board of Directors of the Colombian Corporation for Agricultural Research (Corpoica).

Minister of Agriculture
On 5 September 2013, as part of a planned cabinet reshuffle, President Santos announced the appointment of Lizarralde as the new Minister of Agriculture and Rural Development. Lizarralde was sworn in on 11 September succeeding Francisco Estupiñán Heredia in the post.

References

Date of birth missing (living people)
Year of birth missing (living people)
Living people
People from Valle del Cauca Department
Pontifical Xavierian University alumni
20th-century Colombian lawyers
Colombian Conservative Party politicians
Ministers of Agriculture and Rural Development of Colombia
University of Miami Business School alumni